The 1995 Railway Cup Hurling Championship was the 67th staging of the Railway Cup since its establishment by the Gaelic Athletic Association in 1927. The cup began on 5 February 1995 and ended on 2 April 1995.

Connacht were the defending champions, however, they were defeated by Ulster in the semi-final.

On 2 April 1995, Munster won the cup after a 0-13 to 1–09 defeat of Ulster in the final at Croke Park. This was their 39th Railway Cup title overall and their first title since 1992.

Results

Semi-finals

Final

Bibliography

 Donegan, Des, The Complete Handbook of Gaelic Games (DBA Publications Limited, 2005).

References

Railway Cup Hurling Championship
Railway Cup Hurling Championship
Hurling